is a railway station in the city of Aisai, Aichi Prefecture, Japan, operated by Meitetsu.

Lines

Station layout
The station has two opposed side platforms connected by an underground passage. The station has automated ticket machines, Manaca automated turnstiles and is unattended.

Platforms

Adjacent stations

|-
!colspan=5|Nagoya Railroad

Station history
The station was closed in 1944, and reopened in 1956 under its present name. The platforms were reconstructed in 1974 and rearranged into their present configuration in 2004.

Passenger statistics
In fiscal 2017, the station was used by an average of 1,338 passengers daily (boarding passengers only).

Surrounding area
Tsushima Kita High School

See also
 List of Railway Stations in Japan

References

External links

 Official web page 

Railway stations in Japan opened in 1924
Railway stations in Aichi Prefecture
Stations of Nagoya Railroad
Aisai, Aichi